Thomas Ströhl (born October 10, 1988) is a German footballer who plays as a left-back for Hildesheim.

Career

Ströhl began his career with Rot-Weiß Erfurt and made his debut for the club in May 2008, as a substitute for Alexander Schnetzler in a 1–1 draw with VfB Lübeck and over the next five years made over 90 appearances in the 3. Liga. He signed for Goslarer SC in 2013 and Carl Zeiss Jena a year later.

References

External links

1988 births
Living people
German footballers
FC Rot-Weiß Erfurt players
FC Carl Zeiss Jena players
Goslarer SC 08 players
VfB Germania Halberstadt players
Lupo Martini Wolfsburg players
Sportspeople from Erfurt
3. Liga players
Association football fullbacks
Footballers from Thuringia